Cross Keys or Crosskeys may refer to:

Places

United Kingdom
 Crosskeys, Wales
 Crosskeys railway station
 Crosskeys College, a campus of Coleg Gwent
 Crosskeys Bridge, a swing bridge in Lincolnshire, England
 The Cross Keys (disambiguation), several pubs in the United Kingdom
 Cross Keys Inn, a pub in Bath, England
 Walpole Cross Keys, a village and civil parish in Norfolk, England

United States
(by state then city):
 Cross Keys, Delaware
 Cross Keys, Georgia, now part of Brookhaven, Georgia
 Cross Keys, Lexington, Kentucky
 Crosskeys, Louisiana
 Village of Cross Keys, Baltimore, Maryland
 Cross Keys, New Jersey
 Cross Keys Airport
 Crossed Keys Tavern, an historic stone building located in Turtlecreek Township near Lebanon, Ohio 
 Cross Keys, Adams County, Pennsylvania
 Cross Keys, Blair County, Pennsylvania
 Cross Keys, South Carolina
 Cross Keys, Virginia

Other
 The crossed Keys of Heaven, the symbol of Saint Peter, an element in:
 Papal regalia and insignia
 the Coat of arms of the Holy See
 the arms used by the Guild of Cathedral Vergers
 The symbol of Peterhouse Boat Club
 A symbol on the arms of St Peter's College, Oxford
 Battle of Cross Keys, in the American Civil War
 Cross Keys RFC, a rugby union team and the symbol of the team